Hunt Construction Group is an American construction management firm based in Indianapolis, Indiana. The company was formerly known as Huber, Hunt & Nichols was founded in 1944 by Paul B. Hunt, Arber J. Huber and Harry S. Nichols. The firm changed its name from Huber, Hunt & Nichols to its current name in 2000. It was acquired by AECOM in 2014.

Notable Projects

Aviation
Denver International Airport South Terminal Development
Detroit Metropolitan Wayne County Airport Edward H. McNamara Midfield Terminal
Hartsfield–Jackson Atlanta International Airport Maynard B. Jackson International Terminal
Indianapolis International Airport Col. H. Weir Cook Terminal
Phoenix Sky Harbor International Airport Terminal 4

Convention Centers
Boston Convention and Exhibition Center
Calvin L. Rampton Salt Palace Convention Center
Connecticut Convention Center
Kay Bailey Hutchison Convention Center Expansion
DeVos Place Convention Center
Moscone West
San Jose McEnery Convention Center Expansion

Education

Higher Education
Case Western Reserve University Richard F. Celeste Biomedical Research Building
Case Western Reserve University Kelvin Smith Library
Case Western Reserve University Peter B. Lewis Building
Collin County Community College District
Rose-Hulman Alumni Center
Rose-Hulman Residence Hall
Princeton University Lewis Science Library
Purdue University Philip E. Nelson Hall of Food Science
Syracuse University Science & Technology Center
University of California, Berkeley School of Law Infill
University of California, Berkeley Central Dining & Office Facility
University of California, Santa Barbara San Clemente Student Apartments
University of Louisville Dr. Donald E. Baxter Biomedical Research Building
University of North Texas Environmental Education, Science, and Technology Building
University of Pittsburgh John G. Rangos School of Health Sciences
Yale University Rosenkrantz Hall

K-12
Anna May Elementary School
Boswell High School
Coyote Ridge Elementary School
Frisco Lone Star High School
LaVallita Elementary School
Mansfield Legacy High School
Robinswood Middle School

Government

Cedar Hill Government Center
City of Lewisville Library
Collin County Justice Center
Major General Emmitt J. Bean Center
San Francisco Federal Building
 Fresno County Courthouse

Healthcare
Carson Tahoe Hospital
Carson Tahoe Regional Medical Center
UPMC Children's Hospital of Pittsburgh
UCSF Helen Diller Family Comprehensive Cancer Center
Los Angeles County+USC Medical Center
Methodist Hospital North
Riley Outpatient Center
San Antonio Military Medical
Sequoia Hospital
VA New Southern Nevada Medical Center

Hospitality
Arizona Biltmore Hotel
Bonnet Creek Resort
Conrad Hotel Indianapolis
Grande Lakes Orlando
Hotel Palomar Phoenix CityScape
Isleta Resort and Casino
JW Marriott Complex Indianapolis
JW Desert Ridge
Marriott Downtown Louisville
The Umstead Hotel and Spa
W Fort Lauderdale

Office
Salesforce Tower (Indianapolis)
CityScape Block 22
Countrywide at Chandler
Merrill Lynch at Southfields
One Liberty Place
Procter & Gamble Headquarters
Rosewood Court

Performing Arts
Charles W. Eisemann Center for Performing Arts
DeVos Performance Hall
Globe-News Center for the Performing Arts
University of North Texas Lucille “Lupe” Murchison Performing Arts Center
University of Texas of the Permain Wagner Noël Performing Arts Center

Sports

Arenas
Amway Center
FLA Live Arena
Barclays Center
Bell Center
College Park Center
PPG Paints Arena
intuit Dome
Rupp Arena (Original construction and Proposed 2014 Renovation)
Spectrum Center
United Center

Stadiums
Oracle Park
Busch Stadium
Chase Field
Citi Field
Citizens Bank Park
Los Angeles Memorial Coliseum Renovation (Joint Venture with Hathaway Dinwiddie Construction Company) 
Comerica Park
Gerald J. Ford Stadium
Great American Ballpark
Lucas Oil Stadium
LoanDepot Park
Caesars SuperdomeAmerican Family Field
Nationals Park
Cardinal Stadium
Progressive Field
Pratt & Whitney Stadium at Rentschler Field
T-Mobile Park
SoFi Stadium
Southwest University Park
Tropicana Field
State Farm Stadium
Mercedes-Benz Stadium
JMA Wireless Dome

References

External links
Official Hunt Construction Group website

Construction and civil engineering companies of the United States
Companies based in Indianapolis
American companies established in 1944
Construction and civil engineering companies established in 1944
1944 establishments in Indiana